Fu Yaoquan (born November 1963) is a vice admiral (zhongjiang) of the People's Liberation Army (PLA), serving as political commissar of the Northern Theater Command Navy since September 2020. He is a representative of the 19th National Congress of the Chinese Communist Party.

Biography
Fu was born in Shaoxing, Zhejiang, in November 1963. In September 2014, he became deputy director of the Political Department of East Sea Fleet, concurrently serving as political commissar of the 17th Convoy Formation of the People's Liberation Army Navy in the Gulf of Aden. Three months later, he was appointed political commissar of Dalian Naval Academy. In 2017, he rose to become director of the Political Department of South Sea Fleet. In September 2020, he was promoted again to become political commissar of the Northern Theater Command Navy.

He was promoted to the rank of rear admiral (Shaojiang) in May 2016 and vice admiral (zhongjiang) in September 2020.

References

1963 births
Living people
People from Shaoxing
People's Liberation Army generals from Zhejiang